Pollux Temple is a  summit in the Grand Canyon, in Coconino County of northern Arizona, US. It is situated ten miles northwest of Grand Canyon Village, and less than one mile northeast of Jicarilla Point. Castor Temple is one mile northwest, and Diana Temple is one mile southeast. Pollux Temple is named for Pollux, the divine son of Zeus according to Greek mythology. Clarence Dutton began the practice of naming geographical features in the Grand Canyon after mythological deities. According to the Köppen climate classification system, Pollux Temple is located in a Cold semi-arid climate zone.

Geology
The top of Pollux Temple is composed of Permian Toroweap Formation overlaying cream-colored, cliff-forming, Permian Coconino Sandstone. The sandstone, which is the third-youngest of the strata in the Grand Canyon, was deposited 265 million years ago as sand dunes. Below the Coconino Sandstone is reddish, slope-forming, Permian Hermit Formation, which in turn overlays the Pennsylvanian-Permian Supai Group. Further down are strata of the conspicuous cliff-forming Mississippian Redwall Limestone, the Cambrian Tonto Group, and finally granite of the Paleoproterozoic Vishnu Basement Rocks at river level in Granite Gorge. Precipitation runoff from Pollux Temple drains north to the Colorado River via Agate and Sapphire Canyons.

Gallery

See also
 Geology of the Grand Canyon area
 Scorpion Ridge

References

External links

 Weather forecast: National Weather Service
 Pollux Temple from Piute Point: Flickr photo
 Pollux Temple photo by Harvey Butchart

Grand Canyon
Landforms of Coconino County, Arizona
Mountains of Arizona
Mountains of Coconino County, Arizona
Colorado Plateau
Grand Canyon National Park
North American 1000 m summits
Grand Canyon, South Rim
Grand Canyon, South Rim (west)